Lan Fong Macy Lau (born 27 June 1956) is an archer from Hong Kong.

Archery
Lau took part in the 1983 World Archery Championships and finished in 76th position.

She competed in the 1984 Summer Olympic Games and finished 37th with 2326 points scored in the women's individual event.

References

External links
 Profile on worldarchery.org

1956 births
Living people
Hong Kong female archers
Olympic archers of Hong Kong
Archers at the 1984 Summer Olympics